Siphona collini is a Palearctic species of fly in the family Tachinidae.

Distribution
Europe, Russia, Japan, Mongolia.

Hosts
Noctuidae.

References

Tachininae
Diptera of Europe
Insects described in 1960